Ludwig Mies van der Rohe (born Maria Ludwig Michael Mies; March 27, 1886August 17, 1969) was a German-American architect and furniture designer. He was commonly referred to as Mies, his surname. Along with Alvar Aalto, Le Corbusier, Walter Gropius and Frank Lloyd Wright, he is regarded as one of the pioneers of modernist architecture.

In the 1930s, Mies was the last director of the Bauhaus, a ground-breaking school of modernist art, design and architecture. After Nazism's rise to power, with its strong opposition to modernism (leading to the closing of the Bauhaus itself), Mies emigrated to the United States. He accepted the position to head the architecture school at what is today the Illinois Institute of Technology in Chicago.

Mies sought to establish his own particular architectural style that could represent modern times just as Classical and Gothic did for their own eras. The style he created made a statement with its extreme clarity and simplicity. His mature buildings made use of modern materials such as industrial steel and plate glass to define interior spaces. He strove toward an architecture with a minimal framework of structural order balanced against the implied freedom of unobstructed free-flowing open space. He called his buildings "skin and bones" architecture. He sought an objective approach that would guide the creative process of architectural design, but was always concerned with expressing the spirit of the modern era. He is often associated with his fondness for the aphorisms "less is more" and "God is in the details".

Early career

Mies was born March 27, 1886, in Aachen, Germany. He worked in his father's stone carving shop and at several local design firms before he moved to Berlin, where he joined the office of interior designer Bruno Paul. He began his architectural career as an apprentice at the studio of Peter Behrens from 1908 to 1912, where he was exposed to the current design theories and to progressive German culture. He worked alongside Le Corbusier and Walter Gropius, who was later also involved in the development of the Bauhaus. Mies served as construction manager of the Embassy of the German Empire in Saint Petersburg under Behrens.

Ludwig Mies renamed himself as part of his transformation from a tradesman's son to an architect working with Berlin's cultural elite, adding "van der" and his mother's maiden name "Rohe" (the word mies means "lousy" in German) and using the Dutch "van der", because the German form "von" was a nobiliary particle legally restricted to those of genuine aristocratic lineage. He began his independent professional career designing upper-class homes.

Personal life
In 1913, Mies married Adele Auguste (Ada) Bruhn (1885–1951), the daughter of a wealthy industrialist. The couple separated in 1918, after having three daughters: Dorothea (1914–2008), an actress and dancer who was known as Georgia, Marianne (1915–2003), and Waltraut (1917–1959), who was a research scholar and curator at the Art Institute of Chicago. During his military service in 1917, Mies fathered a son out of wedlock.

In 1925 Mies began a relationship with designer Lilly Reich that ended when he moved to the United States; from 1940 until his death, artist Lora Marx (1900–1989) was his primary companion. Mies carried on a romantic relationship with sculptor and art collector Mary Callery for whom he designed an artist's studio in Huntington, Long Island, New York. He had a brief romantic relationship with Nelly van Doesburg. After having met in Europe many years prior, they met again in New York in 1947 during a dinner with Josep Lluís Sert where he promised her he would help organize an exhibition in Chicago featuring the work of her late husband Theo van Doesburg. This exhibition took place from October 15 until November 8, 1947, with their romance officially ending not much later. Nevertheless they remained on good terms, spending Easter together in 1948 at a modern farmhouse renovated by Mies on Long Island, as well as meeting several more times that year. He also was rumored to have a brief relationship with Edith Farnsworth, who commissioned his work for the Farnsworth House. His daughter Marianne's son, Dirk Lohan (b. 1938), studied under, and later worked for, Mies.

Traditionalism to Modernism

After World War I, while still designing traditional neoclassical homes, Mies began a parallel experimental effort. He joined his avant-garde peers in the long-running search for a new style that would be suitable for the modern industrial age. The weak points of traditional styles had been under attack by progressive theorists since the mid-nineteenth century, primarily for the contradictions of hiding modern construction technology with a facade of ornamented traditional styles.

The mounting criticism of the historical styles gained substantial cultural credibility after World War I, a disaster widely seen as a failure of the old world order of imperial leadership of Europe. The aristocratic classical revival styles were particularly reviled by many as the architectural symbol of a now-discredited and outmoded social system. Progressive thinkers called for a completely new architectural design process guided by rational problem-solving and an exterior expression of modern materials and structure rather than what they considered the superficial application of classical facades.

While continuing his traditional neoclassical design practice, Mies began to develop visionary projects that, though mostly unbuilt, rocketed him to fame as an architect capable of giving form that was in harmony with the spirit of the emerging modern society. Boldly abandoning ornament altogether, Mies made a dramatic modernist debut in 1921 with his stunning competition proposal for the faceted all-glass Friedrichstraße skyscraper, followed by a taller curved version in 1922 named the Glass Skyscraper.

He constructed his first modernist house with the Villa Wolf in 1926 in Guben (today Gubin, Poland) for Erich and Elisabeth Wolf. This was shortly followed by Haus Lange and Haus Esters in 1928.

He continued with a series of pioneering projects, culminating in his two European masterworks: the temporary German Pavilion for the Barcelona exposition (often called the Barcelona Pavilion) in 1929 (a 1986 reconstruction is now built on the original site) and the elegant Villa Tugendhat in Brno, Czechoslovakia, completed in 1930.

He joined the German avant-garde, working with the progressive design magazine G, which started in July 1923. He developed prominence as architectural director of the Werkbund, organizing the influential Weissenhof Estate prototype modernist housing exhibition. He was also one of the founders of the architectural association Der Ring. He joined the avant-garde Bauhaus design school as their director of architecture, adopting and developing their functionalist application of simple geometric forms in the design of useful objects. He served as its last director.

Like many other avant-garde architects of the day, Mies based his architectural mission and principles on his understanding and interpretation of ideas developed by theorists and critics who pondered the declining relevance of the traditional design styles. He selectively adopted theoretical ideas such as the aesthetic credos of Russian Constructivism with their ideology of "efficient" sculptural assembly of modern industrial materials. Mies found appeal in the use of simple rectilinear and planar forms, clean lines, pure use of color, and the extension of space around and beyond interior walls expounded by the Dutch De Stijl group. In particular, the layering of functional sub-spaces within an overall space and the distinct articulation of parts as expressed by Gerrit Rietveld appealed to Mies.

The design theories of Adolf Loos found resonance with Mies, particularly the ideas of replacing elaborate applied artistic ornament with the straightforward display of innate visual qualities of materials and forms. Loos had proposed that art and crafts should be entirely independent of architecture, that the architect should no longer control those cultural elements as the Beaux Arts principles had dictated. Mies also admired his ideas about the nobility that could be found in the anonymity of modern life.

The bold work of leading American architects was admired by European architects. Like other architects who viewed the drawings in Frank Lloyd Wright's Wasmuth Portfolio, Mies was enthralled with the free-flowing spaces of inter-connected rooms that encompass their outdoor surroundings, as demonstrated by the open floor plans of the Wright's American Prairie Style. American engineering structures were also held up as exemplary of the beauty possible in functional construction, and American skyscrapers were greatly admired.

Emigration to the United States

Starting in 1930, Mies served as the last director of the faltering Bauhaus, at the request of his colleague and competitor Walter Gropius. In 1932, the Nazis forced the state-sponsored school to leave its campus in Dessau, and Mies moved it to an abandoned telephone factory in Berlin. In April 1933, the school was raided by the Gestapo, and in July of that year, because the Nazis had made the continued operation of the school untenable, Mies and the faculty "voted" to close the Bauhaus. The Nazis deemed his style to be insufficiently "German" (meaning Aryan) in character. As a result, he was unable to receive commissions in Germany and built very little in these years (one built commission was Philip Johnson's New York apartment). 

As a result of these actions by the Nazis, Mies reluctantly left his homeland in 1937, accepting a residential commission in Wyoming and then an offer to head the department of architecture of the newly established Illinois Institute of Technology (IIT) in Chicago. There he introduced a new kind of education and attitude later known as Second Chicago School, which became very influential in the following decades in North America and Europe.

Career in the United States

Mies settled in Chicago, Illinois, where he was appointed head of the architecture school at Chicago's Armour Institute of Technology (later renamed Illinois Institute of Technology). One of the benefits of taking this position was that he would be commissioned to design the new buildings and master plan for the campus. All his buildings still stand there, including Alumni Hall, the chapel, and his masterpiece the S.R. Crown Hall, built as the home of IIT's School of Architecture.

In 1944, he became an American citizen, completing his severance from his native Germany. His thirty years as an American architect reflect a more structural, pure approach toward achieving his goal of a new architecture for the twentieth century. He focused his efforts on enclosing open and adaptable "universal" spaces with clearly arranged structural frameworks, featuring prefabricated steel shapes filled in with large sheets of glass.

His early projects at the IIT campus, and for developer Herbert Greenwald, presented to Americans a style that seemed a natural progression of the almost forgotten nineteenth century Chicago School style. His architecture, with origins in the German Bauhaus and western European International Style, became an accepted mode of building for American cultural and educational institutions, developers, public agencies, and large corporations.

American work

Mies worked from his studio in downtown Chicago for his entire 31-year period in America. His significant projects in the U.S. include in Chicago and the area: the residential towers of 860–880 Lake Shore Dr, the Chicago Federal Center complex, the Farnsworth House, Crown Hall and other structures at IIT; and the Seagram Building in New York. These iconic works became the prototypes for his other projects. He also built homes for wealthy clients.

Chicago Federal Complex

Chicago Federal Center Plaza, also known as Chicago Federal Plaza, unified three buildings of varying scales: the mid-rise Everett McKinley Dirksen United States Courthouse, the high-rise John C. Kluczynski Building, and the single-story Post Office building. The complex's plot area extends over two blocks; a one-block site, bounded by Jackson, Clark, Adams, and Dearborn streets, contains the Kluczynski Federal Building and U.S. Post Office Loop Station, while a parcel on an adjacent block to the east contains the Dirksen U.S. Courthouse.  The structural framing of the buildings is formed of high-tensile bolted steel and concrete. The exterior curtain walls are defined by projecting steel I-beam mullions covered with flat black graphite paint, characteristic of Mies's designs. The balance of the curtain walls are of bronze-tinted glass panes, framed in shiny aluminum, and separated by steel spandrels, also covered with flat black graphite paint. The entire complex is organized on a 28-foot grid pattern subdivided into six 4-foot, 8-inch modules. This pattern extends from the granite-paved plaza into the ground-floor lobbies of the two tower buildings with the grid lines continuing vertically up the buildings and integrating each component of the complex.  Associated architects that have played a role in the complex's long history from 1959 to 1974 include Schmidt, Garden & Erickson; C.F. Murphy Associates; and A. Epstein & Sons.

Farnsworth House

Between 1946 and 1951, Mies van der Rohe designed and built the Farnsworth House, a weekend retreat outside Chicago for an independent professional woman, Dr. Edith Farnsworth. Here, Mies explored the relationship between people, shelter, and nature. The glass pavilion is raised six feet above a floodplain next to the Fox River, surrounded by forest and rural prairies.

The highly crafted pristine white structural frame and all-glass walls define a simple rectilinear interior space, allowing nature and light to envelop the interior space. A wood-paneled fireplace (also housing mechanical equipment, kitchen, and toilets) is positioned within the open space to suggest living, dining and sleeping spaces without using walls. No partitions touch the surrounding all-glass enclosure. Without solid exterior walls, full-height draperies on a perimeter track allow freedom to provide full or partial privacy when and where desired. The house has been described as sublime, a temple hovering between heaven and earth, a poem, a work of art.

The Farnsworth House and its  wooded site was purchased at auction for US$7.5 million by preservation groups in 2004 and is now owned and operated by the National Trust for Historic Preservation as a public museum. The building influenced the creation of hundreds of modernist glass houses, most notably the Glass House by Philip Johnson, located near New York City and also now owned by the National Trust.

The house is an embodiment of Mies' mature vision of modern architecture for the new technological age: a single unencumbered space within a minimal "skin and bones" framework, a clearly understandable arrangement of architectural parts. His ideas are stated with clarity and simplicity, using materials that are configured to express their own individual character.

The Promontory – Lake Shore Drive 
The Promontory Apartments is a 22-story skyscraper in Hyde Park, Chicago, Illinois, that overlooks Promontory Point in Burnham Park and its Lake Michigan beaches.  It is the first residential skyscraper Mies designed and the first of his buildings to feature concepts such as an exposed skeleton. An active community cooperative, the building which is on the U.S. National Register of Historic Places, has 122 units.  Its building was initiated by developer Herbert Greenwald for wealthier occupants.  Mies employed a Double T design with the horizontal cross-bars joined; the stems of the T's form wings to the rear. Each T is its own building with separate addresses, elevators, and interior stairways. This tripartite design would feature prominently in future Mies designs. Starting with the third story, each floor of each T has three apartments that share an elevator lobby.  A solarium and party room on the roof provides excellent views of the park and beaches to the east, and the University of Chicago to the west.

860–880 Lake Shore Drive

Mies designed a series of four middle-income high-rise apartment buildings for developer Herbert Greenwald: the 860–880 (which was built between 1949 and 1951) and 900–910 Lake Shore Drive towers on Chicago's Lakefront. These towers, with façades of steel and glass, were radical departures from the typical residential brick apartment buildings of the time. Mies found their unit sizes too small for him, choosing instead to continue living in a spacious traditional luxury apartment a few blocks away. The towers were simple rectangular boxes with a non-hierarchical wall enclosure, raised on stilts above a glass-enclosed lobby.

The lobby is set back from the perimeter columns, which were exposed around the perimeter of the building above, creating a modern colonnade not unlike those of the Greek temples. This configuration created a feeling of light, openness, and freedom of movement at the ground level that became the prototype for countless new towers designed both by Mies's office and his followers. Some historians argue that this new approach is an expression of the American spirit and the boundless open space of the frontier, which German culture so admired.

Once Mies had established his basic design concept for the general form and details of his tower buildings, he applied those solutions (with evolving refinements) to his later high-rise building projects. The architecture of his towers appears similar, but each project represents new ideas about the formation of highly sophisticated urban space at ground level. He delighted in the composition of multiple towers arranged in a seemingly casual non-hierarchical relation to each other.

Just as with his interiors, he created free flowing spaces and flat surfaces that represented the idea of an oasis of uncluttered clarity and calm within the chaos of the city. He included nature by leaving openings in the pavement, through which plants seem to grow unfettered by urbanization, just as in the pre-settlement environment.

Seagram Building

Although now acclaimed and widely influential as an urban design feature, Mies had to convince Bronfman's bankers that a taller tower with significant "unused" open space at ground level would enhance the presence and prestige of the building. Mies' design included a bronze curtain wall with external H-shaped mullions that were exaggerated in depth beyond what was structurally necessary. Detractors criticized it as having committed Adolf Loos's "crime of ornamentation". Philip Johnson had a role in interior materials selections, and he designed the sumptuous Four Seasons Restaurant. The Seagram Building is said to be an early example of the innovative "fast-track" construction process, where design documentation and construction are done concurrently.

During 1951–1952, Mies' designed the steel, glass, and brick McCormick House, located in Elmhurst, Illinois (15 miles west of the Chicago Loop), for real-estate developer Robert Hall McCormick, Jr. A one-story adaptation of the exterior curtain wall of his famous 860–880 Lake Shore Drive towers, it served as a prototype for an unbuilt series of speculative houses to be constructed in Melrose Park, Illinois. The house has been moved and reconfigured as a part of the public Elmhurst Art Museum. He also built a residence for John M. van Beuren on a family estate near Morristown, New Jersey.

Museum of Fine Arts, Houston

Mies designed two buildings for the Museum of Fine Arts, Houston (MFAH) as additions to the Caroline Wiess Law Building. In 1953, the MFAH commissioned Mies van der Rohe to create a master plan for the institution. He designed two additions to the building—Cullinan Hall, completed in 1958, and the Brown Pavilion, completed in 1974. A renowned example of the International Style, these portions of the Caroline Wiess Law Building comprise one of only two Mies-designed museums in the world.

Two buildings in Baltimore, MD 
The One Charles Center, built in 1962, is a 23-story aluminum and glass building that heralded the beginning of Baltimore's downtown modern buildings. The Highfield House, just to the northeast of the Johns Hopkins Homewood campus, was built in 1964 as a rental apartment building. The 15-story concrete tower became a residential condominium building in 1979. Both buildings are now on the National Register of Historic Places.

National Gallery, Berlin

Mies's last work was the Neue Nationalgalerie art museum, the New National Gallery for the Berlin National Gallery. Considered one of the most perfect statements of his architectural approach, the upper pavilion is a precise composition of monumental steel columns and a cantilevered (overhanging) roof plane with a glass enclosure. The simple square glass pavilion is a powerful expression of his ideas about flexible interior space, defined by transparent walls and supported by an external structural frame. Art installations by Ulrich Rückriem (1998) or Jenny Holzer, as much as exhibitions on the work of Renzo Piano or Rem Koolhaas have demonstrated the exceptional possibilities of this space.

The glass pavilion is a relatively small portion of the overall building, serving as a symbolic architectural entry point and monumental gallery for temporary exhibits. A large podium building below the pavilion accommodates most of the museum's total built area with conventional white-walled art gallery spaces and support functions. A large window running along all the West facade opens these spaces up to the large sculpture garden which is part of the podium building.

Mies Building at Indiana University in Bloomington, Indiana
In 1952, a fraternity commissioned Mies to design a building on the Indiana University campus in Bloomington, Indiana. The plan was not realized during his lifetime, but the design was rediscovered in 2013, and in 2019 the university's Eskenazi School of Art, Architecture + Design announced they would be constructing it with blessing of his grandchildren. As of June 2022, the building is completed and open.

Martin Luther King Jr. Memorial Library

Mies designed Martin Luther King Jr. Memorial Library, the building was completed in 1972 at a cost of $18 million, and 3 years after Ludwing Mies death. It is the central facility of the District of Columbia Public Library (DCPL), it is his only public library.

Furniture

Mies, often in collaboration with Lilly Reich, designed modern furniture pieces using new industrial technologies that have become popular classics, such as the Barcelona chair and table, the Brno chair, and the Tugendhat chair. These pieces are manufactured under licence by the Knoll furniture company.

His furniture is known for fine craftsmanship, a mix of traditional luxurious fabrics like leather combined with modern chrome frames, and a distinct separation of the supporting structure and the supported surfaces, often employing cantilevers to enhance the feeling of lightness created by delicate structural frames.

Educator
Mies served as the last director of Berlin's Bauhaus, and then headed the department of architecture, Illinois Institute of Technology  in Chicago, where he developed the Second Chicago School. He played a significant role as an educator, believing his architectural language could be learned, then applied to design any type of modern building. He set up a new education at the department of architecture of the Illinois Institute of Technology in Chicago replacing the traditional Ecole des Beaux-Art curriculum by a three-step-education beginning with crafts of drawing and construction leading to planning skills and finishing with theory of architecture (compare Vitruvius: firmitas, utilitas, venustas). He worked personally and intensively on prototype solutions, and then allowed his students, both in school and his office, to develop derivative solutions for specific projects under his guidance.

Some of Mies' curriculum is still put in practice in the first and second year programs at IIT, including the precise drafting of brick construction details so unpopular with aspiring student architects. When none was able to match the quality of his own work, he agonized about where his educational method had gone wrong. Nevertheless, his achievements in creating a teachable architecture language that can be used to express the modern technological era survives until today.

Mies placed great importance on education of architects who could carry on his design principles. He devoted a great deal of time and effort leading the architecture program at IIT. Mies served on the initial Advisory Board of the Graham Foundation in Chicago. His own practice was based on intensive personal involvement in design efforts to create prototype solutions for building types (860 Lake Shore Drive, the Farnsworth House, Seagram Building, S. R. Crown Hall, The New National Gallery), then allowing his studio designers to develop derivative buildings under his supervision.

In 1961, a program at Columbia University's School of Architecture celebrated the four great founders of contemporary architecture: Charles-Edouard Le Corbusier, Walter Gropius, Ludwig Mies van der Rohe and Frank Lloyd Wright. It included addresses by Le Corbusier and Gropius as well as an interview with Mies van der Rohe. Discussion focused upon philosophies of design, aspects of their various architectural projects, and the juncture of architecture and city planning.

Mies's grandson Dirk Lohan and two partners led the firm after he died in 1969. Lohan, who had collaborated with Mies on the New National Gallery, continued with existing projects but soon led the firm on his own independent path. Other disciples continued Mies's architectural language for years, notably Gene Summers, David Haid, Myron Goldsmith, Y.C. Wong, Jacques Brownson, and other architects at the firms of C.F. Murphy and Skidmore, Owings & Merrill.

But while Mies' work had enormous influence and critical recognition, his approach failed to sustain a creative force as a style after his death and was eclipsed by the new wave of Post Modernism by the 1980s. Proponents of the Post Modern style attacked the Modernism with clever statements such as "less is a bore" and with captivating images such as Crown Hall sinking in Lake Michigan. Mies had hoped his architecture would serve as a universal model that could be easily imitated, but the aesthetic power of his best buildings proved impossible to match, instead resulting mostly in drab and uninspired structures rejected by the general public. The failure of his followers to meet his high standard may have contributed to demise of Modernism and the rise of new competing design theories following his death.

Later years and death
Over the last twenty years of his life, Mies developed and built his vision of a monumental "skin and bones" architecture that reflected his goal to provide the individual a place to fulfill himself in the modern era. Mies sought to create free and open spaces, enclosed within a structural order with minimal presence. In 1963, he was awarded the Presidential Medal of Freedom.

Mies van der Rohe died on August 17, 1969, from esophageal cancer caused by his smoking habit.  After cremation, his ashes were buried near Chicago's other famous architects in Chicago's Graceland Cemetery. His grave is marked by an intentionally unadorned, clean-line black slab of polished granite and a large honey locust tree.

Archives
The Ludwig Mies van der Rohe Archive, an administratively independent section of the Museum of Modern Art's department of architecture and design, was established in 1968 by the museum's trustees. It was founded in response to the architect's desire to bequeath his entire work to the museum. The archive consists of about nineteen thousand drawings and prints, one thousand of which are by the designer and architect Lilly Reich (1885–1947), Mies van der Rohe's close collaborator from 1927 to 1937; of written documents (primarily, the business correspondence) covering nearly the entire career of the architect; of photographs of buildings, models, and furniture; and of audiotapes, books, and periodicals.

Archival materials are also held by the Ryerson & Burnham Libraries at the Art Institute of Chicago. The Ludwig Mies van der Rohe Collection, 1929–1969 (bulk 1948–1960) includes correspondence, articles, and materials related to his association with the Illinois Institute of Technology. The Ludwig Mies van der Rohe Metropolitan Structures Collection, 1961–1969, includes scrapbooks and photographs documenting Chicago projects.

Other archives are held at the University of Illinois at Chicago (personal book collection), the Canadian Centre for Architecture (drawings and photos) in Montreal, the Newberry Library in Chicago (personal correspondence), and at the Library of Congress in Washington D.C. (professional correspondence).

List of works

 Early career in Europe (1907–1938)
 1908 Riehl House – Residential home, Potsdam, Germany
 1911 Perls House – Residential home, Zehlendorf 
 1913 Werner House – Residential home, Zehlendorf 
 1917 Urbig House – Residential home, Potsdam
 1922 Kempner House – Residential home, Charlottenburg 
 1922 Eichstaedt House – Residential home, Wannsee 
 1922 Feldmann House – Residential home, Wilmersdorf 
 1923 Ryder House –  Residential home, Wiesbaden
 1925 Villa Wolf – Residential home, Guben
 1926 Mosler House – Residential home, Babelsberg 
 1926  – Monument dedicated to Karl Liebknecht and Rosa Luxemburg, Zentralfriedhof Friedrichsfelde, Berlin
 1927 Afrikanische Straße Apartments – Multi-Family Residential, Berlin, Germany 
 1927 Weissenhof Estate – Housing Exhibition coordinated by Mies and with a contribution by him, Stuttgart 
 1928 Haus Lange and Haus Esters – Residential home and an art museum, Krefeld 
 1929 Barcelona Pavilion – World's Fair Pavilion, Barcelona, Spain
 1930 Villa Tugendhat – Residential home, Brno, Czechia, designated a World Heritage Site by UNESCO in 2001
 1930 Verseidag Factory – Dyeing and HE Silk Mill building Krefeld, Germany 
 1932 Lemke House – Residential home, Weissensee

 Buildings after emigration to the United States (1939–1960)
 1939–1958 – Illinois Institute of Technology Campus Master Plan, academic campus & buildings, Chicago, Illinois
 1949 The Promontory Apartments – Residential apartment complex, Chicago, Illinois
 1951 Sheridan-Oakdale Apartments (2933 N Sheridan Rd ) – Residential apartment complex, Chicago, Illinois
 1951 Lake Shore Drive Apartments – Residential apartment towers, Chicago
 1951 Algonquin Apartments – Residential apartments, Chicago, Illinois
 1951 Farnsworth House – Vacation home, Plano, Illinois
 1952 Arts Club of Chicago Interior Renovation – Art gallery, demolished in 1997, Chicago, Illinois
 1952 Robert H. McCormick House – Residential home, relocated to the Elmhurst Art Museum, Elmhurst, Illinois
 1954 Cullinan Hall – Museum of Fine Arts, Houston
 1956 Crown Hall, Illinois Institute of Technology College of Architecture – Academic building, Chicago, Illinois
 1956 900-910 North Lake Shore (Esplanade Apartments) – Residential apartment complex, Chicago, Illinois 
 1957 Commonwealth Promenade Apartments (330–330 W Diversey Parkway) – Residential apartment complex, Chicago (1957)
 1958 Seagram Building – Office tower, New York City, New York
 1958 Caroline Wiess Law Building, Museum of Fine Art, Houston
 1959 Home Federal Savings and Loan Association Building – Office building, Des Moines, Iowa
 1959 Lafayette Park – Residential development, Detroit, Michigan.
 1960 Pavilion and Colonnade Apartments– Residential complex, Newark, New Jersey

 Late career Worldwide (1961–69)
 1961 Bacardi Office Building – Office Building, Mexico City
 1962 Tourelle-Sur-Rive – Residential apartment complex of three towers, Nuns' Island, Montreal, Quebec, Canada
 1962 Home Federal Savings and Loan Association of Des Moines Building – Office Building, Des Moines, Iowa
 1962 One Charles Center – Office Tower, Baltimore, Maryland
 1963 2400 North Lakeview Apartments – Residential Apartment Complex, Chicago, Illinois 
 1963 Morris Greenwald House – Vacation Home, Weston, Connecticut
 1964 Chicago Federal Center – Civic Complex, Chicago, Illinois
 1960–1964 Dirksen Federal Building – Office Tower, Chicago
 Kluczynski Federal Building – Office Tower, Chicago
 United States Post Office Loop Station – General Post Office, Chicago
 1964 Highfield House, 4000 North Charles – Originally Rental Apartments, and now Condominium Apartments, Baltimore, Maryland
 1965 University of Chicago School of Social Service Administration – Academic Building Chicago, Illinois
 1965 Richard King Mellon Hall – Duquesne University, Pittsburgh, PA
 1965 Meredith Hall – School of Journalism and Mass Communication, Drake University, Des Moines, IA
 1967 Westmount Square – Office & Residential Tower Complex, Westmount, Island of Montreal, Quebec, Canada
 1968 Neue Nationalgalerie – Modern Art Museum, Berlin, Germany
 1965–1968 Brown Pavilion, Museum of Fine Art, Houston
 1967–1969 Toronto-Dominion Centre – Office Tower Complex, Toronto, Ontario, Canada
 1969 Filling station – Nuns' Island, Montreal, Quebec, Canada (closed)
 1970 One Illinois Center – Office Tower, Chicago, Illinois (completed post-mortem)
 1972 Martin Luther King, Jr. Memorial Library – District of Columbia Public Library, Washington, D.C. (completed post-mortem)
 1973 American Life Building – Louisville, Kentucky (completed after Mies's death by Bruno Conterato)
 1973 IBM Plaza – Office Tower, Chicago (completed post-mortem)

 Buildings on the Illinois Institute of Technology Campus (1939–1958)
 1943 Minerals & Metals Research Building – Research
 1945 Engineering Research Building – Research
 1946 Alumni Memorial Hall – Classroom
 1946 Wishnick Hall – Classroom
 1946 Perlstein Hall – Classroom
 1950 I.I.T. Boiler Plant – Academic
 1950 Institute of Gas Technology Building – Research
 1950 American Association of Railroads Administration Building (now the College of Music Building) – Administration
 1952 Mechanical Engineering Research Building I – Research
 1952 Carr Memorial Chapel – Religious
 1953 American Association of Railroads Mechanical Engineering Building – Research
 1953 Carman Hall at IIT – Dormitory
 1955 Cunningham Hall – Dormitory
 1955 Bailey Hall – Dormitory
 1955 I.I.T. Commons Building
 1956 Crown Hall – Academic, College of Architecture
 1957 Physics & Electrical Engineering Research Building – Research
 1957 Siegel Hall – Classroom
 1953 American Association of Railroads Laboratory Building – Research
 1958 Metals Technology Building Extension – Research

See also
International style (architecture)
Barcelona chair

References

Further reading

 
 
 
 Lamster, Mark (2018). "The man in the Glass House: Philip Johnson, Architect of the Modern Century" (hardcover,528 pages) Little, Brown & Co. English; ; 
 
 
 Rovira, Josep M; Casais, Lluis (2002). Mies van der Rohe Pavilion: Reflections,71 pages. Publisher:Triangle Postal.

External links

 Mies van der Rohe Society
 Mies van der Rohe Foundation
 
 Mies in Berlin-Mies in America
 Great Buildings Architects
Mies van der Rohe Spotlight – ArchDaily
 Elmhurst Art Museum, featuring McCormick House
 Richard King Mellon Hall, Duquesne University, Pittsburgh, PA
 Mies, IIT, and the Second Chicago School
Mies in America exhibition
 Travel guide to Mies Buildings
 Construction underway to transform famed Nuns' Island gas station
 Mies' Lafayette Park in Detroit
 Mies in IR
 Ludwig Mies van der Rohe architectural and furniture drawings, 1946–1961, held by the Avery Architectural and Fine Arts Library, Columbia University
 Finding aid for the Ludwig Mies van der Rohe and his students collection , Canadian Centre for Architecture

Ludwig Mies van der Rohe
Functionalist architects
1886 births
1969 deaths
19th-century Prussian people
20th-century American architects
Academic staff of the Bauhaus
Burials at Graceland Cemetery (Chicago)
20th-century German architects
German emigrants to the United States
German furniture designers
Illinois Institute of Technology faculty
Architecture educators
International style architects
Modernist architects from Germany
People from Aachen
Artists from Chicago
People from the Rhine Province
Recipients of the Pour le Mérite (civil class)
Recipients of the Royal Gold Medal
Presidential Medal of Freedom recipients
Fellows of the American Institute of Architects
Recipients of the AIA Gold Medal